We Love Machine is the fourth studio album by English electronic music duo Way Out West, released on 21 September 2009 by Hope Recordings. The album is considered the group's move away from the trip hop genre and a further venture into their progressive house style, and gathered generally positive reviews. It features the lead single and EP "Only Love", and web exclusive release, "Future Perfect". On 19 April 2010, a remix album was released, titled We Love Machine – The Remixes.

Release

We Love Machine was preceded with the release of its lead single "Only Love", its music video and its EP of the same name on Hope Recordings on 7 September 2009 to promote the then upcoming album. After the album's release, a second single was released titled "Future Perfect" on Hope Recordings, released web-exclusively.

The album was released by Hope Recordings on 21 September 2009 in the UK. It was then later released on 405 Recordings in Australia, on Universal Records in Greece and Russia, Armada Digital in the Netherlands, High Note Recordings in Taiwan, and Love Da Records in Hong Kong.

Track listing

We Love Machine – The Remixes

On 19 April 2010, Way Out West released a remix album titled We Love Machine – The Remixes through Hope Recordings. It is composed of remixes from We Love Machine, as the title suggests, with the exception of two instrumental mixes and the final track; Way Out West's remix of their 1996 hit single "The Gift".

Track listing

CD

References

External links
wayoutwestmusic.co.uk

Way Out West (duo) albums
2009 albums
2010 remix albums